Edmund Powell or Appowell (by 1506 – 1558/1559), of New Windsor, Berkshire and Sandford-on-Thames, Oxfordshire, was an English politician.

He was a Member (MP) of the Parliament of England for Ludgershall in October 1553 and April 1554; and for Oxfordshire in 1555.

References

1559 deaths
People from Windsor, Berkshire
People from Oxfordshire
English MPs 1553 (Mary I)
Year of birth uncertain
English MPs 1554
English MPs 1555